Ralph C. Kenney (c. 1887 – February 6, 1966) was an American coach, sports administrator, and military officer. He coached football, basketball, and baseball at William & Vashti College, and Louisiana Tech University.

Early life and education 
Kenney born in Athens, Ohio. He was a graduate of Ohio State University and did graduate work at University of Chicago. He was a veteran of World War I, during which he served with the 82nd Airborne Division, and World War II.

Career 
In 1915, Kenney served as the head football coach for William & Vashti College in Aledo, Illinois and led them to a record of 6–2. Kenney later became the head coach for Louisiana Tech's football, men's basketball, and baseball teams for the 1925–26 academic year. He coached Louisiana Tech's football team to a record of 1–7–2. Kenney was the first basketball coach in Louisiana Tech history and led Louisiana Tech's basketball team to 7–7 record in the program's inaugural season. The Bulldogs lost the program's first two games to Centenary, but Kenney recorded Louisiana Tech's first ever basketball victory against Louisiana College. Kenney experienced the most success on the diamond leading Louisiana Tech's baseball team to a record of 17–5.

Kenney was the athletic director at Highland Park Junior College in Highland Park, Michigan before moving on in 1929 to the same role at Carroll College in Waukesha, Wisconsin.

Kenney retired from military service in 1950 as a colonel in the United States Air Force. Kenney live the last 25 years of his life in Phoenix, Arizona. He died on February 6, 1966, at Phoenix Veterans Hospital in Phoenix.

Head coaching record

Football

Basketball

Baseball

References

Year of birth missing
1880s births
1966 deaths
Carroll Pioneers athletic directors
Louisiana Tech Bulldogs and Lady Techsters athletic directors
Louisiana Tech Bulldogs football coaches
Louisiana Tech Bulldogs basketball coaches
Louisiana Tech Bulldogs baseball coaches
Rhodes Lynx athletic directors
Rhodes Lynx football coaches
Ohio State University alumni
University of Chicago alumni
United States Air Force officers
United States Army officers
United States Army personnel of World War I
People from Athens, Ohio
Coaches of American football from Ohio
Baseball coaches from Ohio
Basketball coaches from Ohio
Military personnel from Ohio